Dudow may refer to:
Slatan Dudow, Bulgarian film director
Dudow, Iran, a village in Hormozgan Province, Iran